Kačji Potok is a settlement in the Municipality of Kočevje in southern Slovenia. The area is part of the traditional region of Lower Carniola and is now included in the Southeast Slovenia Statistical Region.

Geography
Kačji Potok lies in a valley southeast of Mozelj below the east slope of the Šibje Ridge and Štajdoh (or Štavdoh) Hill. Hribček Hill stands to the northwest, and the losing stream sharing the name of the village, Snake Creek (Kačji potok), lies to the southeast. The village is surrounded by woods where many blueberries grow.

Name
The name Kačji Potok means 'snake creek'. The village was attested in historical sources in 1574 as Otterpach (literally, 'otter creek' < German Otter 'otter' + Bach 'creek'), presumably named after otters living there. The Slovenian name Kačji Potok is a later (mis)translation of the German name (cf. German Otter 1. 'otter', 2. 'adder, viper').

History
Kačji Potok was historically a Gottschee German village. In the land registry of 1574 the village consisted of 12 half-farms. Before the Second World War, the village had 22 houses. Italian forces burned the village in the summer of 1942, leaving only one house standing. During the war, a nearby abandoned mill was used as a field hospital by the Partisans—a forerunner to a later facility at Staro Brezje. After the war, the remaining house in the village was torn down and the Kočevje Collective Farm (KGP Kočevje) built two barns for cattle at the site.

Church
The village church, dedicated to Saint Stephen, was a 15th-century structure and was mentioned in historical sources around 1526. It was refurbished in the 18th and 19th century, but was demolished after the Second World War.

References

External links
Kačji Potok on Geopedia
Pre–World War II map of Kačji Potok with oeconyms and family names

Populated places in the Municipality of Kočevje